The 12011/12012 Kalka Shatabdi Express is a Superfast Express train of Shatabdi class belonging to Indian Railways that runs between New Delhi and Kalka in India. It is a daily service. It operates as train number 12011 from New Delhi railway station to Kalka railway station and as train number 12012 in the reverse direction. The train is mostly used by tourists, along with Netaji Express, en route to Shimla. Thus, gaining its international patronage.

Coaches

The Kalka Shatabdi Express generally has 2 Executive AC Chair Car (EC) coaches, 14 AC Chair Car(CC) coaches, two luggage cum generator coaches. The train runs with LHB coach. As customary, the composition of coaches is at the discretion of Indian Railways. There is no pantry car but catering is arranged on board the train.

Service

It is the fastest train on the Delhi–Kalka sector. It shares this distinction with its sister train 12005/06 Kalka Shatabdi Express. It covers the distance of 303 kilometers in 4 hours 05 mins as 12011 Shatabdi Express (76.20 km/hr) and 4 hours 10 mins as 12012 Shatabdi Express (76.72 km/hr).

Loco link

It is regularly hauled by a WAP-7 locomotive with HOG capability from the Ghaziabad Shed. It receives banker engines between Chandigarh & Kalka. Generally, these are WAP-4 or WAP-5.

Time Table

The 12011 Kalka Shatabdi Express leaves New Delhi every day at 07:40 hrs IST and reaches the Kalka at 11:45 hrs IST. On return, the 12012 Kalka Shatabdi Express leaves Kalka every day at 17:45 hrs IST and reaches the New Delhi at 21:55 hrs IST. Being a Shatabdi, it returns to its originating station, New Delhi, at the end of the day.

References

External links

Shatabdi Express trains
Rail transport in Haryana
Rail transport in Delhi
Rail transport in Chandigarh
Transport in Delhi